Orbital Reef is a planned low Earth orbit (LEO) space station designed by Blue Origin and Sierra Nevada Corporation's Sierra Space for commercial space activities and space tourism uses. Blue Origin has referred to it as a "mixed-use business park". The companies released preliminary plans on 25 October 2021. The station is being designed to support 10 persons in 830 m3 of volume. The station is expected to be operational by 2027.

On 2 December 2021, NASA announced it had selected Blue Origin as one of three companies to develop designs of space stations and other commercial destinations in space. Blue Origin was awarded $130 million. These Space Act Agreements are the first phase of two with which NASA aims to maintain an uninterrupted U.S. presence in low-Earth orbit by transitioning from the International Space Station to other platforms.

Partners 
Blue Origin and Sierra Space have partnered with several companies and institutions to realize the project:
 Blue Origin: Partner, providing vehicle utility core systems, large-diameter modules, and the reusable heavy-lift New Glenn launch system.
 Amazon: logistics and supply chain management.
 Amazon Web Services: AWS will provide a variety of integrated cloud services and tools to support both near-term and long-term technical requirements including space station development and design, flight operations, data management, enterprise architecture, integrated networking, logistics, and communications capabilities.
 Sierra Space: Partner, providing Large Integrated Flexible Environment (LIFE) modules, node modules, and runway-landing Dream Chaser spaceplane for crew and cargo transportation.
 Mitsubishi Heavy Industries.
 Boeing: Providing science modules, space station operations and maintenance, and the Starliner crew spacecraft
 Redwire Space: Providing payload operations and deployable structures, and support for microgravity research, development, and manufacturing.
 Genesis Engineering Solutions: Providing the Single Person Spacecraft for routine external operations and tourist excursions.
 Arizona State University: Providing research advisory services and public outreach through a global consortium of fourteen leading universities.

See also 

 
 
 
 
 
 List of commercial space stations

References

External links 
 https://www.orbitalreef.com/

 proposed hotels
 proposed space stations
 destination resorts
 space tourism
 Blue Origin